Crockerella crystallina is a species of sea snail, a marine gastropod mollusk in the family Conidae, the cone snails and their allies.

Description

Distribution

References

crystallina
Gastropods described in 1865